Archana Deodhar (born 2 February 1971) is a female badminton player from India.She was the bronze medalist in badminton at the 1998 Commonwealth Games in the Women's Team event. She was the coach of national women's badminton team.

Career
Deodhar has won five national doubles titles at Indian National Badminton Championship.

References

External links
 

Indian female badminton players
Indian national badminton champions
Living people
1971 births
Marathi people
Sportswomen from Maharashtra
Commonwealth Games medallists in badminton
Commonwealth Games bronze medallists for India
20th-century Indian women
20th-century Indian people
Badminton players at the 1998 Commonwealth Games
Racket sportspeople from Maharashtra
Medallists at the 1998 Commonwealth Games